Traralgon Centre Plaza, formerly Stockland Traralgon, is a shopping centre in Traralgon, Victoria, Australia.

History
Developed by the Grollo Group, it opened in November 1985 as Traralgon Centre Plaza. In June 1989 it was sold to Barnett Corporation. In 1992 it was sold to a fund managed by Schroders.

In June 2003, the centre was acquired by the Stockland and rebranded Stockland Traralgon. In March 2021 it was sold to Fawkner Property and rebranded back to Traralgon Centre Plaza.

Major tenants
Coles
Cotton On
Kmart
Liquorland
Priceline
The Reject Shop

References

External links

Shopping centres in Victoria (Australia)
Shopping malls established in 1985
Traralgon
1985 establishments in Australia